Sensible and Sensuality is a collection of essay by Indian feminist writer Sarojini Sahoo. Published in 2010, the book contains the author's view on feminism.  Sahoo is a key figure and trend-setter of feminism in contemporary Indian literature. She has been listed among 25 exceptional women of India by Kindle English magazine of Kolkata. For Sahoo, feminism is not a "gender problem" or confrontational attack on male hegemony and, as such, differs from the feminist views of Virginia Woolf or Judith Butler.

Summary 
Feminism has often been misunderstood as a bunch of stereotyped hysterical man-hating fanatics who seek power and control rather than true equality. But to the author, "feminism2 is not just a movement for the liberation of women, but rather a broad social movement striving for the equality of each individual worldwide. Feminism should emphasise the importance of such values as cooperation, tolerance, nurturance, and the freedom for each person to achieve her or his full potential.
The author thinks feminism should not act in opposition to men as individuals. To her, feminism is against oppressive and outdated social structures which forces both men and women into positions which are false and antagonistic. Thus, everyone has an important role to play in the feminist movement. It seems ironic that feminism has been characterized as anti-male, when in fact; it seeks to liberate men from the macho stereotypic roles men often have to endure such as the need to suppress feelings, act aggressively, and be deprived of contact with children. I think we should emphasize our femininity rather to impose the so-called stereotyped feministic attitude of the second wave.
Redefining femininity with Eastern perspective, Sensible Sensuality explores why sexuality plays a major role in our understanding of Eastern feminism. As an Indian feminist, many of Sahoo’s writings deal candidly with female sexuality, the emotional lives of women, and the intricate fabric of human relationships, depicting extensively about the interior experiences of women and how their burgeoning sexuality is seen as a threat to traditional patriarchal societies; this book is rare of its kind and has covered the topics that never be discussed so far in any Indian discourse. Her debatable concept on feminism, her denial of Simone de Beauvoir’s "the other theory", make her a prominent feminist personality of South Asia.

Feminism 

Sahoo accepts feminism as an integral part of femaleness separate from the masculine world. Writing with a heightened awareness of women's bodies, she has developed an appropriate style that exploits openness, fragmentation, and nonlinearity. Simone de Beauvoir, in her book The Second Sex, first elaborately described the gender role and problem away from biological differences. In Oriya literature, Sarojini is considered a key figure to discuss sexuality in her fiction with a sincere effort to express her feminist ideas. Sahoo agrees with De Beauvoir that women can only free themselves by “thinking, taking action, working, creating, on the same terms as men; instead of seeking to disparage them, she declares herself their equal." She disagrees, however, that though women have the same status to men as human beings, they have their own identity and they are different from men. They are "others" in real definition, but this is not in context with Hegelian definition of “others”. It is not always due to man's "active" and "subjective" demands. They are the others, unknowingly accepting the subjugation as a part of "subjectivity". Sahoo, however, contends that while the woman identity is certainly constitutionally different from that of man, men and women still share a basic human equality. Thus the harmful asymmetric sex /gender "Othering" arises accidentally and "passively" from natural, unavoidable intersubjectivity.

Treating female sexuality from puberty to menopause, her fiction always projects a feminine sensibility. Feminine feelings such as restrictions during adolescence or pregnancy, fear factors such as rape or being condemned by society, the concept of the "bad girl" and so on, are treated thematically and in-depth throughout her novels and short stories.

Her feminism is constantly linked to the sexual politics of a woman. She denies patriarchal limits of sexual expression for a woman and she identifies women's sexual liberation as the real motive behind the women's movement.  In South Asian Outlook, an e-magazine published from Canada, Menka Walia writes: “Sahoo typically evolves her stories around Indian women and sexuality, which is something not commonly written about, but is rather discouraged in a traditionalist society. As a feminist, she advocates women’s rights and usually gives light to the injustices Eastern women face. In her interviews, she usually talks about the fact that women are second-class citizens in India, backing up these facts with examples of how love marriages are forbidden, the rejection of divorces, the unfairness of dowries, and the rejection of female politicians.”.
For her, orgasm is the body's natural call to feminist politics: if being a woman is this good, women must be worth something. Her novels like Upanibesh, Pratibandi and Gambhiri Ghara  cover a myriad of areas from sexuality to philosophy; from the politics of the home to politics of the world. According to American journalist Linda Lowen, Sarojini Sahoo has written extensively as an Indian feminist about the interior lives of women and how their burgeoning sexuality is seen as a threat to traditional patriarchal societies.

Femininity 

For many feminist thinkers, after marriage a family breeds patriarchy. Happily married women are considered false and double-crossing. The titles of popular feminist books from the early movement highlight the split between gender feminists and women who chose domesticity. Jill Johnston, in her Lesbian Nation (1973), called the married women are heterosexual females 'traitors'; Kate Millett, in her Sexual Politics (1970), redefined heterosexual sex as a power struggle; whereas in Kathrin Perutz's Marriage is Hell (1972) and Ellen Peck's The Baby Trap (1971), they argued motherhood blocks liberation of a woman. These feminists always try to paint the marriage as legalized prostitution and heterosexual intercourse as rape; and they come to the decision that men are the enemy; families are prisons.
Betty Friedan, Germaine Greer  were against marriage in their earlier thoughts. But they tried to skip from their anti marriage ideas in later periods. Marriage is a three-sided arrangement between a husband, a wife and the society. That is, the society legally defines what a marriage is and how it can be dissolved. But marriage is on the other hand for partners of marriage, It is more of an individual relationship than a social matter. This is the main reason of crisis. Individually I think, marriage must be taken out of the social realm and fully back into the private one. The society should withdraw from marriage and allow the adults involved to work out their own definition of justice in the privacy of their own homes.
Many feminist thinkers try to ignore the idea that offspring yearning is a natural instinct of a woman and it is related to our ecological and environmental situation. But Sahoo finds a woman has to pass through a different stages in her life span and there is a phase where a woman feels an intense need of her own offspring. Feminists of a second wave of feminism have always tried to pursue a woman against the natural law because it seemed to them that motherhood is barricade to the freedom of a woman. But if the woman has her own working field, doesn't have it mean that her working assignments would demand more of her time, of her sincerity and of course of her freedom? If a woman can adjust herself and can sacrifice her freedom for her own identity outside her home, then why she shouldn't sacrifice some of her freedom for parenting, when parenting is also a part of one of her social identity? And it could also be solved by rejecting the patriarchal role of parenting. We have to insist on the idea of the division of labor in parenting. This equally shared parenting is now common in Western countries, but still in South Asian countries we find it as a taboo factor instead because of economic inequality between men and women, our crazy work culture, and the constrictions that are placed on us by traditional gender roles.

The conflict between American mother-daughter feminists Alice Walker and Rebecca Walker is a well known chapter for Western feminism. Alice Walker, the mother, the second-wave feminist, obviously had an anti motherhood ideas as the other western feminists of her time. But Rebecca Walker, her daughter and a feminist of third wave, discussed in her book Baby Love about how motherhood freed women like herself from their roles as daughters, and how this provided the much-needed perspective to heal themselves from damaged mother-daughter relationships and claim their full adulthood. What happened? This latest article is mired in unresolved childish hurt and anger (especially in the chapter “How my mother’s fanatical views tore us apart”), which would be all well and good except that she strikes out at her mother by striking out at feminism. Sahoo personally thinks, the bitterness between her and her mother, as any woman who has ever fallen out with her mother knows, it is a very painful experience and note to self, one that probably shouldn't be written about too much in public.
The author accepts feminism as a total entity of female hood which is completely separate from the man's world. To her, femininity has a wonderful power. In these de-gendered times, a really feminine woman is a joy to behold and one can love and unleash one's own unique yet universal femininity. Author argues for gender sensitivity to proclaim the differences between men and woman with a kind of pretense that all are same and equal. Too many women have been de-feminized by society. To be feminine is to know how to pay attention to detail and people, to have people skills and to know how to connect to and work well with others. There will be particular times and situations within which you'll want to be more in touch and in tune with your femininity than others – being able to choose is a great skill.

Sexuality

Sexuality is something that can be related to many other aspects of culture, tightly-linked with an individual life, or into the evolution of a culture.  Anyone's class or ethnic or geographic identity could be closely associated to his/her sexuality, or anyone's sense of art or literature.  Sexuality is not just an entity in itself.

Still, either in West or in East, there is a reluctant outlook towards sexuality. Society has always tried to hide it from any open forum. But neither society, nor the legislature, or even the judiciary stand by the side of sexuality to support it.

In the West, James Joyce’s Ulysses or even Radclyffe Hall's Loneliness in the Well or Virginia Woolf’s  Orlando are some examples which have to suffer a lot for describing sexuality in literature. Sexuality in literature grew with feminism.

Simone de Beauvoir, in her book The Second Sex, first elaborately described the gender role and problem away from biological differences. In Oriya literature, Sarojini is considered a key figure to discuss sexuality in her fiction with a sincere effort to express her feminist ideas.

Translation in other languages 
Machhum Billah and Hassan Mehedi have translated this book into Bengali and it was published from Bangladesh by Bangla Prakash, Dhaka, in 2012. A Malayalam version of this book has been published by Chintha Publishers, Thiruvananthapuram, Kerala, in 2013, in Prameela KP's translation under the title Pennakam.

See also 
List of feminists
List of feminist literature
The Dark Abode
Sarojini Sahoo Stories

References

External links
 Sarojini Sahoo - Official Web site
 Sarojini Sahoo - Blog
 Sarojini Sahoo - Sawnet Bio
 Oriya Nari
 Orissa Diary

2010 non-fiction books
Feminist books
Sociology books
Literature by women